Araloside A is an anti-ulcer isolate of Aralia elata bark.

References 

Triterpene glycosides
Saponins